The 2000 Summer Olympics cauldron is a heritage-listed former Olympic flame holder and now fountain at Cathy Freeman Park, near the corner of Olympic Boulevard and the Grand Parade, Sydney Olympic Park, in the City of Parramatta Council, New South Wales, Australia. It was originally designed by Michael Scott-Mitchell for the 2000 Summer Olympics with the design of the re-presentation in Cathy Freeman Park by Tzannes Associates. It was built from 2000 to 2010 by Engineers Tierney and Partners with the assistance of LUSAS Civil and Structural. It is also known as Olympic Cauldron at Sydney Olympic Park, The Cauldron, Sydney Olympic Games Cauldron, Millenium Games Cauldron and Sydney 2000 Games Cauldron. The property is owned by the Sydney Olympic Park Authority. It was added to the New South Wales State Heritage Register on 10 September 2010.

History

Sydney 2000 Summer Olympic Games
The Sydney 2000 Games, officially known as the Games of the XXVII Olympiad or the Millennium Games, was an international multi-sport event which was celebrated between 15 September and 1 October 2000 in Sydney. It was the second time that the Summer Olympics were held in the southern hemisphere (the first being the 1956 Summer Olympics in Melbourne).

The Sydney 2000 Games was considered to be a great sporting event and national success story: 'From the moment the first stock horse and rider galloped in to the centre of the opening-ceremony stage...the public sentiment became one of overwhelming confidence. The weather remained friendly. ...The venues, the crowd control and the public transport system were perfect, the volunteers a delight. ...For 17 days, from opening to closing, the whole experience had an almost other-worldly quality to it. To be in the streets was to be surrounded by a smile. ...The mood of mutual enjoyment was infectious and at times a little dream-like. ...Like all Olympic Games, Sydney 2000 showcased heroes and heroines and yielded lifetime memories that encapsulated proud and improbably spectacles, as well as performances that prickled our deepest emotions. ...10,561 athletes from 200 countries competed for 300 gold medals. . . (Gordon, 2003, p191-3)

Juan Antonio Samaranch, President of the International Olympic Committee (IOC) famously stated at the conclusion to the games: "You have presented to the world the best Olympic Games ever".

The Sydney Olympic Games opening ceremony
At sunset on Friday, 15 September 2000, approximately 110,000 spectators and over 12,000 performers celebrated the opening of the 27th Olympiad in Sydney, Australia. Four billion viewers joined them worldwide.

Ric Birch, the Director of Ceremonies and David Atkins, the artistic director, produced an epic pageant of Australian culture. From a lone rider on a chestnut stallion to the 120 stock horses and riders who started the show at a gallop, to the 11 minutes corroboree, Awakening, where 900 indigenous citizens created the most haunting segment of the opening ceremony to the performers who breathed flames to recreate a bushfire, the audience saw a visual tapestry of this country.

In Deep Sea Dreaming, 13-year-old Nikki Webster floated amongst giant luminous jellyfish, seahorses, and anemones above the arena, while the sea floor flickered with schools of human fish. Dreamtime spirits represented by Djakapurra Munyarryn and hundreds of clan members filled the stadium with images of the original Australians, which led into a magical wildflower carpet, with people dressed as honey myrtles, waterlilies, banksias, and Sturt Desert peas, with waratahs glowing a vibrant crimson. Hundreds of students sprouted petals and leaves.

Captain Cook's First Fleet arrived, then Ned Kelly came out in force in Tin Symphony, which paid tribute to Australia's rural beginnings. Then, "Arrivals" introduced the many people from every continent who have chosen to call Australian home, culminating in a thunderous tribute to industry in the form of Adam Garcia's large troupe of tappers, who made the sparks fly. They were then joined by many of the 12,600 performers for a huge finale before welcoming to the arena a 2,000 piece marching band with participants from around the globe. Their stirring renditions of "Waltzing Matilda", "Chariots of Fire" and the LA Olympic fanfare and theme introduced the athletes who were to follow.

A seemingly endless parade of 12,000 athletes and coaches, from 200 countries - the largest representation of any Olympic games. North and South Korea marched united for the first time in nearly a century, and a wave of emotion swept the stadium, but nothing compared to the roar that greeted the Australian team.

Herb Elliott, 1,500m gold medallist at Rome, ran with the torch into Stadium Australia and handed it to Betty Cuthbert, whose wheelchair was pushed by Raelene Boyle. Dawn Fraser, Shirley Strickland de la Hunty, Shane Gould and Debbie Flintoff-King then carried the flame in tribute to 100 years of women's participation in the Olympics.

Finally the Torch was handed to Cathy Freeman, Australia's favourite who was given the honour of lighting the cauldron, in a magnificent display of fire and water against a backdrop of the seventy-metre waterfall'.

The lighting of the Olympic Cauldron at the Sydney 2000 Olympics
On 10 May 2000 in Olympia, Greece, the 2000 Summer Olympics torch relay was commenced with a flame which would be carried by various means of transport across the world to Australia. In Australia the torch followed a circuitous 27,000 km journey around the country visiting many towns and communities, starting in Uluru and ending in Sydney. the Torch relay ceremony became characterised by "a blend of pride, enjoyment, wonder and bonding - a reinforced sense of national identity" (Gordon, 2003, p144).

The final lap of Stadium Australia with the torch offered not only the opportunity to for the 110,000 crowd to salute a magnificent medley of six Australian women who had between them won 15 gold medals. There was a "kind of crossing-off process" in solving the identity of the person who would light the Olympic Cauldron. The relay had begun with young indigenous woman Nova Peris, and ended with another in Cathy Freeman. The Freeman culmination, at the end of a ceremony that had emphasised Aboriginal heritage and addressed the issue of reconciliation, amounted to a quietly eloquent statement about the kind of nation Australia aspired to be. It underlined itself boldly as a significant moment in the nation's history.

Freeman ascended four flights of stairs carrying the torch before walking across a shallow circular pond to an island in the centre, where she dipped the torch low and swept it around her to ignite a ring of fire. The pond concealed a submerged ring-shaped cauldron which slowly rose around Freeman as fire burned around the 150 gas-fed nozzles around the rim. The concealed cauldron concept was the brainchild of Ric Birch; he had nursed it since he first took it to engineers and project managers in 1995. The submerged cauldron as it appeared on the night was conceived by the cauldron designer, Michael Scott-Mitchell. He designed the sequence with Freeman in mind four years earlier but was only informed that she would indeed light the cauldron in the early hours of the day of the Opening Ceremony. Freeman stood motionless as the flaming cauldron rose around her, however the cauldron conveyor mechanism tripped an emergency sensor which caused the cauldron to remain in place above Freeman, at the base of the conveyor designed to move the cauldron to the roof of the stadium. Freeman stood beneath the flaming cauldron for approximately three minutes, holding a pose of the torch raised above her as the two attendant engineers, Teter Tait and Rob Ironside scrambled to re-start the conveyor. The cauldron was successfully restarted and reached its destination at the top of the stadium.

Despite the temporary glitch, the television footage of Cathy Freeman lighting the cauldron was declared "the sporting image of the year" by Sportel, a major international sports television convention held annually in Monaco, which awarded its coveted "Golden Podium" award to the Sydney Olympic Broadcasting Organisation for the cauldron lighting sequence.

Cathy Freeman
Catherine Astrid Salome Freeman, OAM (known as Cathy Freeman) (born 16 February 1973) is an Australian Aboriginal sprinter who is particularly associated with the 400 metres running race. She became the Olympic champion for 400 m in the 2000 Sydney games, at which she lit the Olympic Flame. Freeman was born in Slade Point, Mackay, Queensland, where the local athletics track is named after her.

Freeman's first coach was her stepfather, Bruce Barber. By her early teens she had a collection of regional and national titles, from competing in the 100 metres, 200 metres and high jump. In 1990, Freeman was chosen as a member of Australia's 4X100 m relay team for the 1990 Commonwealth Games in Auckland, New Zealand. The team won the gold medal, making Freeman the first Aboriginal Commonwealth Games gold medallist, as well as one of the youngest, at 16 years old. In 1992, Freeman competed in her first Olympic Games, reaching the second round of the 400 metres. Competing at the 1994 Commonwealth Games in Canada, Freeman won gold in both the 200 m and 400 m. At the 1996 Olympics in Atlanta, Freeman won the silver medal behind France's Marie-Jose Perec in an Australian record of 48.63 seconds. In 1997 at the World Championships in Athens, Freeman won the World title in 49.77 seconds and in 1999, successfully defended her World title.

Freeman was the home favourite for the 400 m title at the 2000 Olympics in Sydney, where she was expected to face-off with rival Perec. This showdown never happened, as Perec left the Games after an encounter with an Australian photographer. Freeman won the Olympic title in a time of 49.11 seconds. After the race, Freeman took a victory lap, carrying both the Aboriginal and Australian flags, despite the fact that unofficial flags are banned at the Olympic Games.

After her Olympic triumph, Freeman chose to take a break from the track, not competing during the 2001 season. During 2002, Freeman returned to the track to compete as a member of Australia's victorious 4 × 400 m relay team at the 2002 Commonwealth Games. Freeman announced her retirement in 2003.
'The selection of Freeman to light the Olympic cauldron seemed highly appropriate to most Australians - she excelled in her sport, protested against injustices to Aboriginal people, and spoke proudly of her Aboriginal heritage. These qualities stirred a nation that was debating reconciliation with its indigenous people. Perceptively, a columnist for the Los Angeles Times wrote during the Olympics: 'Freeman has emerged at the Sydney 2000 Games as the most potent symbol of a nation's hopes both for Olympic glory and reconciliation for sins of the past' (as quoted by Paul Sheehan in "Cathy who? Condoms and controversy make a world of difference", Sydney Morning Herald, 27 Sep. 2000, p. 2). Moreover, Freeman's prominence at the opening ceremony encapsulated the Olympic ideals of promoting sport and celebrating the history and culture of the host country.

The lighting of the cauldron at the Sydney 2000 Paralympics
The lighting of the Olympic Cauldron by wheelchair racer Louise Sauvage at the opening ceremony for the Sydney Paralympic Games on 18 October 2000 was another spectacle highlight. It was the culmination of another torch relay, but one that had commenced with a lighting ceremony at Parliament House, Canberra on 5 October 2000. Involving 920 torchbearers, each of whom carried the flame an average of 500 metres, it visited each Australian capital city by air. Then within New South Wales it travelled from Moss Vale through the Southern Highlands, Illawarra, Campbelltown, Penrith, Windsor, Hunter and Central Coast areas before heading to Sydney. Like the Olympic Torch Relay before it, the Paralympic Torch Relay succeeded in generating community and media support for the Games, with crowds in many areas and significant crowds lining the Sydney metropolitan route in the final two days of the relay.

The lighting of the cauldron for the Paralympic Sydney Games 2000 was reported in a Sydney newspaper the following morning:
"The lighting of the cauldron, the same one that burned for two weeks during the Olympic Games, was less elaborate than the breathtaking fire-and-water sequence that was the climax of the Olympic opening ceremony. First a miniature cauldron, specially designed and constructed by AGL, which had risen from beneath the centre stage, was lit. The aluminium disc, fuelled by LPG and filled with fibreglass material to enhance the flame, flared brightly as it rose even higher. Then, in the style of a fire breather, it threw a seven-metre-long gas-fuelled flame in the direction of the cauldron high above the stadium floor at the top of the grandstand. That set off a series of relay flames fireworks synchronised by computer to music along the field, on the main stage and up through the stand. It gave the appearance of the flame being whisked up to the main cauldron (also fuelled by gas) which re-ignited to the delight of the 100,000 crowd. The mast was extended to once again lift the cauldron high above the stadium, where it will remain for the next 11 days."

The design of the Olympic Cauldron
The idea of a cauldron lighting ceremony that combined fire and water was conceived by Ric Birch, Director of Ceremonies for the opening ceremony. The cauldron itself was designed by Michael Scott-Mitchell. The structural design of cauldron, mast and transport components was largely undertaken by Tierney and Partners with the assistance of LUSAS Civil and Structural. Its construction involved two years of planning, design and rigorous implementation by a team of design engineers, manufacturers and suppliers covering structural, mechanical, electrical and hydraulic engineering, gas-burner technology and computer control. (NLA catalogue entry for MSM)

On the day of the opening ceremony (15 September 2000), a press release offered Michael Scott-Mitchell's description of his experience of the design process and his understanding of the symbolism of the spectacle:
"In early January 1997, I met with Ric Birch to discuss a "little project" he had in mind for me which turned out to be the design for the Olympic Cauldron. Ric had already thought of using a release of water from the top of the northern stand in some form or other. A suggestion had been made that the Cauldron could be presented by pushing it through the resulting "waterfall". Neither Ric nor I thought this was a particularly appropriate solution although it was a springboard in my mind for the notion of using a water effect with the Cauldron. By the end of our meeting, Ric had presented me with the fabulous brief of working out how to combine fire and water in the presentation of the Olympic Cauldron."
"By the time I had reached my car parked outside Ric's house, I had conceptually resolved the design that exists today. The salient components were that the athlete would appear to walk across a still body of water ('the pond') backed by a turbulent waterfall. Then, in a simple gesture the athlete would apply the Olympic torch to this still body of water in a circle around him or herself and become surrounded by a ring of fire."
"The fire would then lift "magically" revealing it to be the Cauldron rising from under the water and around the athlete. With the athlete remaining at the centre of the pond, the lit Cauldron would continue to rise above the athlete with the waterfall as a backdrop and would appear to "float" above the water torrent cascading down the northern stand as it continued its journey towards the very top."
"I was genuinely excited about the combination of these two natural elements: Fire and Water. Each has its own very particular attributes, which in an unexpected way complement one another perfectly. They are perhaps the two elements that resonate most profoundly with the Australian landscape. Both have cleansing and restorative qualities that cyclically regenerate our land. It is their ability to cleanse and regenerate that symbolically most excited me. Each ceremony lighting the Olympic Cauldron has had a profound and symbolic resonance with its particular period in history. I couldn't help being mindful of the fact that the lighting of the Cauldron for the Sydney 2000 Olympics is the first in a new Millennium, and I was keen to express the notion of the regeneration of the Olympic Spirit in the design."
"...the technological demands of the design have been daunting, and the intervening years have involved the talents of many people in bringing the design to fruition, befitting the Olympic Spirit. These have included theatrical production managers, mechanical engineers, fire and gas experts, water experts, weather experts, risk management experts; the list goes on ... Ric Birch, Michael Knight and latterly David Atkins have been unswerving in their endeavour to see the project fully realised. Finally Director Richard Wherrett was charged with choreographing and directing the entrance of the torch into the stadium, and the lighting of the flame."
"At the end of the day, the lighting of the Cauldron is really about an athlete lighting a flame and providing a symbol that allows our spirits to soar and celebrate all that is positive in human endeavour, whether it be sporting, creative or scientific. It is my hope that we have embodied this in the Sydney 2000 Olympic Cauldron.:

The tradition of the Olympic flame, torch relay and cauldron
The Olympic Flame or Olympic Torch is a symbol of the Olympic Games. Commemorating the theft of fire from the Greek god Zeus by Prometheus, its origins lie in ancient Greece, where a fire was kept burning throughout the celebration of the ancient Olympics. The fire was reintroduced at the 1928 Summer Olympics in Amsterdam, and it has been part of the modern Olympic Games ever since. According to legend, the torch's flame has been kept burning, ever since the first Olympics.

For the ancient Greeks, fire had divine connotations - it was thought to have been stolen from the gods by Prometheus. Therefore, fire was also present at many of the sanctuaries in Olympia, Greece. A fire permanently burned on the altar of Hestia in Olympia, Greece. During the Olympic Games, which honored Zeus, additional fires were lit at his temple and that of his wife, Hera. The modern Olympic flame is ignited at the site where the temple of Hera used to stand.

The Olympic Torch today is ignited several months before the opening celebration of the Olympic Games at the site of the ancient Olympics in Olympia, Greece. Eleven women, representing the Vestal Virgins, perform a ceremony in which the torch is kindled by the light of the Sun, its rays concentrated by a parabolic mirror.

In contrast to the Olympic flame proper, the torch relay of modern times, which transports the flame from Greece to the various designated sites of the games, had no ancient precedent and was introduced by Carl Diem at the controversial 1936 Berlin Olympics.

The Olympic Torch Relay ends on the day of the opening ceremony in the central stadium of the Games. The final carrier is often kept unannounced until the last moment, and is usually a sports celebrity of the host country. The final bearer of the torch runs towards the cauldron, often placed at the top of a grand staircase, and then uses the torch to start the flame in the stadium. It is considered a great honor to be asked to light the Olympic Flame. After being lit, the flame continues to burn throughout the Olympics, and is extinguished on the day of the closing ceremony.

Current presentation of the cauldron
In 2001 the end stand on the northern part of the stadium was removed and Tzannes Associates commissioned to reinterpret the cauldron, relocated nearby to the Overflow, now known as Cathy Freeman Park. There the cauldron's stem was removed and it was repositioned on top of a group of 24 stainless steel poles organized in a haphazard arrangement, approximately 10 metres above the ground. It operates intermittently as a giant fountain with water flowing over the sides of the cauldron onto the pavement below.

Description 
The 8.5 tonne cauldron is a perforated, corrugated shell structure fabricated from stainless steel. It has an overall diameter of 10m and tapers from 0.85m thick at centre down to 0.15m thick at the edge.

The cauldron was designed to rise out of a circular pond after the flame was lit, and ascend, as though floating, up a waterfall to the top of the northern stand. It was collected by a 50-metre mast rising from behind the stand, and the main burner in the tip of the mast was lit.

In 2001 the end stand on the northern part of the stadium was removed and Tzannes Associates commissioned to reinterpret the cauldron, relocated nearby to the Overflow, now known as Cathy Freeman Park. There the cauldron's stem was removed and it was repositioned on top of a group of 24 stainless steel poles organized in a haphazard arrangement, approximately 10 metres above the ground. It operates intermittently as a giant fountain with water flowing over the sides of the cauldron onto the pavement below, to the delight of children who in summer often play under the shower.

The retrofitted cauldron is complete with a new burner system, and a water feature inside the perforated cladding. Both of these features are fed via services in an underground plant room, directly below the cauldron. This plant room is included within the curtilage and also houses: the light fittings lighting the cauldron; irrigation pumps and manifold; potable and non-potable water meters; and filtration and chemical treatment of the water to the water feature.

The cauldron is surrounded by a decorative elliptical pavement inlaid with the names of all those who won gold, silver and bronze medals at the Sydney Olympic Games, known as the "Roll of Honour". The Roll of Honour is an Olympic traditional whereby medal-winning athletes are permanently acknowledged, typically in the vicinity of the Olympic Stadium. [It includes] both Paralympic and Olympic athletes. (OCA Tender, 2001

The integrity and aesthetic significance of the cauldron has been impacted by its change of position since the Sydney 2000 Games. Detached from its stem and removed from its elevated position 50 metres above the ground at the northern end of the Olympic stadium, the cauldron is now perched atop a haphazard arrangement of steel rods in a park near the stadium, where its constantly flowing water forms a popular fountain feature. It can still be lit with a flame for ceremonial occasions.

Heritage listing 

The Olympic Cauldron at Sydney Olympic Park is of State historic significance as the culmination of the opening ceremony of the Sydney Olympic Games on 15 September 2000 and a reminder of Sydney's success and honour in having hosted the Millennium Games. The opening ceremony is considered to be a triumph of Australian showmanship which was watched by hundreds of millions of people around the world. The Olympic Cauldron is also of State significance for its associations with the Olympic athletes who participated in the Sydney 2000 Games and particularly with the Aboriginal athlete Cathy Freeman, who was chosen to be the final Australian link in the Olympic Torch relay to light the cauldron, thus marking the commencement of the Games. The image of the lit cauldron flowing with fire and water as it rose around Freeman is one of the most memorable images of the Sydney Olympic Games. The Olympic Cauldron is of State significance for the esteem in which it is held by Australians proud of the success of the Sydney Olympic Games. It is also of social significance to Sydney Olympic Park visitors for its later role as a popular fountain in the Cathy Freeman Park next to the Olympic Stadium. The Olympic Cauldron is of representative and rarity State significance as the only cauldron designed and built to hold an Olympic flame in NSW.

Olympic Cauldron was listed on the New South Wales State Heritage Register on 10 September 2010 having satisfied the following criteria.

The place is important in demonstrating the course, or pattern, of cultural or natural history in New South Wales.

The Sydney Olympic Park Cauldron is of State historic significance as the culmination of the opening ceremony of the Sydney Olympic Games on 15 September 2000. The opening ceremony is considered to be a triumph of Australian showmanship which was watched by hundreds of millions of people around the world. It is also a reminder of Sydney's success and honour in having hosted the Millennium Games.

The place has a strong or special association with a person, or group of persons, of importance of cultural or natural history of New South Wales's history.

The Sydney Olympic Park Cauldron is of State significance for its associations with the Olympic athletes who participated in the Sydney 2000 Games and particularly with the Aboriginal athlete Cathy Freeman, who was chosen to be the final Australian link in the Olympic Torch relay to light the cauldron, thus symbolising the commencement of the Games. The image of the lit cauldron flowing with water as it rose around Freeman is one of the most memorable images of the Sydney Olympic Games.

The place has strong or special association with a particular community or cultural group in New South Wales for social, cultural or spiritual reasons.

The Sydney Olympic Park Cauldron is of State significance as a symbolic focal point for the Sydney 2000 Olympic Games, which is held in high esteem by many Australians. It is also likely to be of significance for its later role as a popular fountain in the Overflow next to the Olympic Stadium.

The place possesses uncommon, rare or endangered aspects of the cultural or natural history of New South Wales.

The Sydney Olympic Park Cauldron is of State significance as the only Olympic cauldron to be designed and to hold the Olympic flame in NSW.

The place is important in demonstrating the principal characteristics of a class of cultural or natural places/environments in New South Wales.

The Sydney Olympic Park Cauldron is of State significance as the Australian and NSW representative of Olympic cauldrons internationally.

See also

References

Bibliography

Attribution

External links

New South Wales State Heritage Register
cauldron
Fountains in Sydney
Olympic flame
cauldron
Articles incorporating text from the New South Wales State Heritage Register